This is a list of Texas Longhorns football players in the NFL draft.

Key

Selections

References

Texas
Texas Longhorns football
Texas Longhorns in the NFL draft
Texas longhorns NFL draft